Katsuragawa Station may refer to:
Katsuragawa Station (Kyoto), a railway station in Kyoto, Japan
Katsuragawa Station (Hokkaidō), a railway station in Mori, Hokkaidō, Japan